Single-loss expectancy (SLE) is the monetary value expected from the occurrence of a risk on an asset. It is related to risk management and risk assessment.

Single-loss expectancy is mathematically expressed as:

Where the exposure factor is represented in the impact of the risk over the asset, or percentage of asset lost. As an example, if the asset value is reduced by two thirds, the exposure factor value is 0.66. If the asset is completely lost, the exposure factor is 1.

The result is a monetary value in the same unit as the single-loss expectancy is expressed (euros, dollars, yens, etc.):
exposure factor is the subjective, potential percentage of loss to a specific asset if a specific threat is realized. The exposure factor is a subjective value that the person assessing risk must define.

See also
Information assurance
Risk assessment
Annualized loss expectancy

References

External links
 Information Security Risk Analysis Paper from Digital Threat

Data security
Financial risk